Below is a list of all the North American countries, in order of geographical area. North America's total geographical area is 24,500,995 km2.

Countries

Territories
These territories, also located in North America, are not sovereign nations but are either former colonies of European countries still under control of the Kingdom of Denmark, France, the Kingdom of the Netherlands, and the United Kingdom; or historically under the control of the United States.

Transcontinental countries 
The island of Trinidad is sometimes included in South America.

See also
 List of North American countries by population
 List of African countries by area
 List of Asian countries by area
 List of European countries by area
 List of Oceanian countries by area
 List of South American countries by area

References

Countries by geographical area
North American countries
Area